A Thousand Clouds of Peace is a 2003 romantic drama film written and directed by Julián Hernández. Its original Spanish title is Mil nubes de paz cercan el cielo, amor, jamás acabarás de ser amor and alternative titles for it are A Thousand Clouds of Peace Fence the Sky, Love; Your Being Love Will Never End and A Thousand Peace Clouds Encircle the Sky.

Plot
Not long after coming to terms with his homosexuality, 17-year-old Gerardo has broken up with his first serious boyfriend. Trying to ease his pain he has a number of casual sexual encounters in Mexico City.

Cast
Juan Carlos Ortuno as Gerardo
Juan Torres as Bruno
Perla de la Rosa as Anna
Salvador Alvarez as Susana
Rosa-Maria Gomez as Mary
Mario Oliver as Umberto
Clarisa Rendón as Nadia
Salvador Hernandez as Antonio
Pablo Molina as Andres
Martha Gomez as Martha
Manuel Grapain Zaquelarez as Jorge
Miguel Loaiza as Adrian
Llane Fragoso as Mirella
Pilar Ruiz as Lola

Reception
Movie review website Rotten Tomatoes gave A Thousand Clouds of Peace a "rotten" rating of 32% based on eight reviews. Metacritic gave it a "generally negative" rating of 35% based on 16 reviews.

In 2003 the film won the Teddy Award for Best Feature Film at the Berlin International Film Festival as well as the awards for Best First Work at the Lima Latin American Film Festival. In 2004 it won the Silver Ariel at the Ariel Awards in Mexico.

References

External links

 

2003 films
Mexican black-and-white films
2000s Spanish-language films
Mexican LGBT-related films
2003 romantic drama films
Mexican romantic drama films
2000s Mexican films